Kėdainiai Bus Station is the central bus station in Kedainiai, Lithuania. It serves as a terminal for suburban and  national coach services.

History
The first intercity bus station in Kėdainiai was located in the city centre. However, in 1988 it was moved to the outskirts of the city, where it remains today. Nearly 20 years later, it was completely rebuilt and reopened for service on 25 April 2008.

Routes
Valid as of January 1, 2018

Kaunas direction
 Alytus via Cinkiškiai, Kaunas
 Alytus via Nociūnai, Kaunas, Birštonas
 Alytus via Cinkiškiai, Babtai, Birštonas
 Druskininkai via Cinkiškiai, Kaunas
 Kaunas via Cinkiškiai, Babtai
 Kaunas via Labūnava
 Kaunas via Vandžiogala
 Marijampolė via Labūnava, Kaunas
 Marijampolė via Cinkiškiai, Kaunas
 Vilkaviškis via Vandžiogala
 Vilkaviškis via Cinkiškiai, Marijampolė

Raseiniai direction
 Panemunė via Kryžkalnis, Tauragė
 Palanga via Klaipėda (during summer only)

Ukmergė direction
 Vilnius via Šėta, Ukmergė

Šiauliai direction
 Joniškis via Šeduva, Šiauliai
 Joniškis via Linkuva, Pakruojis
 Mažeikiai via Šiauliai, Kuršėnai
 Akmenė via Šiauliai
 Palanga via Šiauliai, Telšiai, Klaipėda
 Žagarė via Šiauliai, Joniškis
 Šiauliai via Šeduva

Panevėžys direction
 Biržai via Panevėžys, Pasvalys
 Joniškėlis via Panevėžys
 Panevėžys via Ramygala
 Panevėžys via Šventybrastis, Upytė
 Panevėžys via Surviliškis, Upytė
 Riga with transfer at Panevėžys

References

Bus stations in Lithuania
Buildings and structures in Kėdainiai